Chinese Japanese or Japanese Chinese may refer to:

Sino-Japanese vocabulary, Japanese vocabulary that originated in the Chinese language or in elements borrowed from Chinese
Kanbun, classical Chinese language as written in Japan
Sino-Japanese relations

See also
Chinese people in Japan
Japanese people in China
Japanese orphans in China